Maria Cebotari (original name: Ciubotaru, 10 February 1910 – 9 June 1949) was a Bessarabian-born Romanian soprano and actress, and an opera and singing star of the 1930s and 1940s.

Beniamino Gigli stated that Cebotari was one of the greatest female voices he had ever heard. Maria Callas was compared to her, and Angela Gheorghiu named Maria Cebotari among the artists she admires the most.

With thousands of people in attendance, her funeral was "one of the most imposing demonstrations of love and honor any deceased artist has ever received" in the history of Vienna.

Biography

Cebotari was born in Chişinău, in Bessarabia, and studied singing at the Chişinău Conservatory, and in 1929 joined the Moscow Art Theater Company as an actress. Shortly after, she married the company's leader, Count Alexander Virubov.

Moving to Berlin with the company, she studied singing with Oskar Daniel for three months. She made her debut as an operatic singer by singing Mimi in Puccini's opera La Bohème at Dresden Semperoper on 15 March 1931. Bruno Walter invited her to the Salzburg Festival, where she sang Euridice in Gluck's opera Orfeo ed Euridice.

In 1935, she sang the part of Aminta in the world premiere of Richard Strauss' opera Die Schweigsame Frau under Karl Böhm at Dresden Semper Opera House. Strauss advised her to move to Berlin, and in 1936 she joined the Berlin State Opera, where she was a prima donna until 1946. That year, she sang Susanna in Le Nozze di Figaro, Zerlina in Don Giovanni, and Sophie in Der Rosenkavalier for Dresden Semper Opera Company's performances at Covent Garden Royal Opera House of London. Cebotari then appeared at many great opera houses, including Vienna State Opera and La Scala Opera House of Milan.

She divorced Count Virubov in 1938, and married the Austrian actor Gustav Diessl, with whom she had two sons. In 1946, she left Berlin and joined the Vienna State Opera House. Cebotari revisited Covent Garden in 1947 with Vienna State Opera Company and sang Salome, Donna Anna in Don Giovanni, and Countess Almaviva in Le nozze di Figaro. On September 27, she was Donna Anna to the Ottavio of Richard Tauber, making his final stage appearance less than a week before his cancerous left lung was removed.

Her husband, the actor Gustav Diessl, died of a heart attack on 20 March 1948. 

In early 1949, she suffered from severe pain during the performance of Le nozze di Figaro at La Scala Opera House. At first, doctors did not perceive it as serious. However, on 31 March, 1949, she fell during the performance of Karl Millöcker's operetta Der Bettelstudent in Vienna. During surgery on 4 April, doctors found cancer in her liver and pancreas. She died from cancer on 9 June, 1949 in Vienna. British pianist Clifford Curzon and his wife Lucille Wallace adopted her two sons.

Cebotari had a versatile voice; her repertoire covered coloratura, soubrette, lyric, and dramatic roles. This is illustrated in her various roles, including Countess Almaviva and Susanna in Le nozze di Figaro, Violetta in La Traviata, and Salome in the same season. She concentrated on four composers – Mozart, Richard Strauss, Verdi, and Puccini. Richard Strauss described her as "the best all-rounder on the European stage, and she is never late, and she never cancels". During a BBC interview decades after her death, Herbert von Karajan said she was the greatest "Madame Butterfly" he had ever conducted.

Films
Along with her successful career at the opera houses, Cebotari appeared in several operatic films, such as Verdi's Three Women, Maria Malibran, and The Dream of Madame Butterfly. [citation needed]

Cebotari also was cast in the film Odessa in fiamme (Odessa in Flames) in 1942, directed by Italian director Carmine Gallone with the script by Nicolae Kiriţescu. The movie is a fascist propaganda film about the Battle of Odessa, which was won by Romanian and Nazi troops. The Romanian-Italian co-production won at the Festival of Venice in 1942. [citation needed]
In the film, Cebotari plays the role of Maria Teodorescu, an opera singer from Bessarabia, who was in Chisinau with her eight-year-old son at the time of the invasion. Her husband fights as a captain in the Romanian army in Bucharest, and her son is taken. Teodorescu was told that he would be maintained in a camp where he would be educated as a Soviet man. To get her son back, Teodorescu agrees to sing Russian songs in theaters and taverns. Her husband finds her photograph by chance, and the family reunites.

Odessa in Flames was banned after Soviet troops reached Bucharest. [citation needed] Someone [who?] later rediscovered the film in the Cinecittà archives in Rome, where it was screened for the first time in years in Romania in December 2006. [citation needed]

Director Victor Druc's documentary "Aria" (2005) about the life of Maria Cebotari faced difficulties when screening in Moldova during the Communist administration (which ended in 2009), due to a part in the movie where the soprano self-identifies as Romanian, contrary to the official policy of the Communist government that calls the ethnic majority Moldovan, rather than Romanian. See also Controversy over linguistic and ethnic identity in Moldova.

Recordings

Many of her surviving recordings are from live performances, either in opera houses or radio broadcasts. Almost all have now been digitally remastered.

The Austrian CD label Preiser Records has issued several of her CDs, among which is The Art of Maria Cebotari and Maria Cebotari singt Richard Strauss.
 Mozart – Le nozze di Figaro (Böhm 1938, in German/Ahlersmeyer, Teschemacher, Schöffler, Wessely, Böhme) Preiser
 Puccini – Turandot (Keilberth 1938, in German/Hauss, Buchta, Hann, Eipperle, Harlan, Schupp, Kiefer), Koch-Schwann
 Schoeck – Das Schloss Dürande (Heger live 1943, excerpts/Anders, Berglund, Fuchs, Domgraf-Fassbaender, Greindl, Hüsch), Jecklin
 R. Strauss – Salome (Krauss 1947 live/Rothmüller, Höngen), Gebhardt
 R. Strauss – Taillefer (Rother 1944/ Walter Ludwig, Hans Hotter), Preiser
 Verdi – Luisa Miller (Elmendorff 1944, in German/Böhme, Hopf, Hann, Herrmann, Eipperle), Preiser
 Verdi – La traviata (Steinkopf 1943, in German/Rosvaenge, Schlusnus), Iron Needle
 von Einem – Dantons Tod (Fricsay live 1947/Schöffler, Patzak, Klein, Weber, Alsen, Hann), Stradivarius
 Recital (Mozart, Verdi, Puccini, Leoncavallo, J. Strauss, Arditi, Rachmaninov, Beckmann, Mackeben, Tchaikovsky), Preiser – LV
 Recital – Maria Cebotari singt Arien (Mozart, J. Strauss, Gounod, Puccini and R. Strauss), Preiser – LV
 Maria Cebotari – Arien, Duette, Szenen (Mozart, Bizet, Verdi, Puccini), Preiser
 Recital – Maria Cebotari singt Richard Strauss (Salome, Feuersnot, Der Rosenkavalier, Daphne, Taillefer), Preiser (Berliner Rundfunk Sinfonie Orchester, Artur Rother, 1–4 recorded 1943, 5 in 1944). 
 Maria Cebotari: Arias, Songs and in Film, Weltbild
 Recital – Maria Cebotari singt Giuseppe Verdi (La traviata, Rigoletto), Preiser
 Four Famous Sopranos of the Past (Gitta Alpar, Jarmila Novotná and Esther Réthy), Preiser – LV
 Bruno Walter Vol. 1, Symphony No 2 and No 4 (1948/50), LYS
 Helge Rosvaenge in Szenen aus André Chénier und Rigoletto – Duets, Preiser
 Helge Rosvaenge – Duets, Preiser – LV
 Grosse Mozartsänger Vol. 1 1922 – 1942, Orfeo
 Von der Königlichen Hofoper zur Staatsoper ‘Unter den Linden’, Preiser – LV

Filmography
 Troika (1930)
 Girls in White (1936)
 Mother Song (1937)
 Strong Hearts (1937)
 Giuseppe Verdi (1938)
 The Dream of Butterfly (1939)
 Love Me, Alfredo! (1940)
 Odessa in Flames (1942)
 Maria Malibran (1943)

Sources

External links

 
 
 
 Photographs and literature
 MoldovaStamps.org 1994 postage stamp of the Republic of Moldova – Maria Cebotari
 

1910 births
1949 deaths
Burials at Döbling Cemetery
Musicians from Chișinău
People from Kishinyovsky Uyezd
Moldovan opera singers
Romanian operatic sopranos
Austrian operatic sopranos
Eastern Orthodox Christians from Moldova
Romanian emigrants to Austria
Romanian people of Moldovan descent
20th-century Romanian women opera singers
20th-century Austrian women opera singers
Deaths from cancer in Austria
Deaths from pancreatic cancer
Deaths from liver cancer
Actors from Chișinău